Kemal Unakıtan (February 14, 1946 – October 12, 2016) was the Minister of Finance of Turkey from November 2002 to May 2009 and a Member of Parliament for Istanbul of the Justice and Development Party. He was born in Edirne.

Previously he was a board member of the Family Finance Group.

During his tenure as minister of finance Unakitan presided over a number of situations primarily the Treasury's need to raise funds (!) at a time when Turkey had a large national debt and was failing to collect taxes to cover it. Unakıtan therefore
 sold forestry land to raise funds for the treasury
 raised fuel duties and other indirect taxation plus
 imposed extra duties and payments such as his "permanent earthquake fund"

On March 7, 2008, Unakıtan received the Finance Minister of the Year Award from the business magazine The Banker.

He died on October 12, 2016 after a prolonged illness.

Books
 Nedim Şener (2005), Fırsatlar Ülkesinde Bir Kemal Abi (A Kemal Abi in A Land of Opportunities)

References

1946 births
2016 deaths
People from Edirne
Ministers of Finance of Turkey
Justice and Development Party (Turkey) politicians
Deputies of Istanbul
Deputies of Eskişehir
Members of the 23rd Parliament of Turkey
Members of the 22nd Parliament of Turkey
Gazi University alumni
Members of the 60th government of Turkey
Deaths from cancer in Turkey
Deaths from prostate cancer